Gary Stephen May (born May 17, 1964) is the chancellor of the University of California, Davis. From May 2005 to June 2011, he was the Steve W. Chaddick School Chair of the School of Electrical & Computer Engineering at Georgia Tech. He served as the Dean of the Georgia Tech College of Engineering from July 2011 until June 2017.

In 2018, May was elected a member of the National Academy of Engineering for contributions to semiconductor manufacturing research and innovations in educational programs for underrepresented groups in engineering.

Biography

Early life
May was born in St. Louis, Missouri. He attended the Georgia Institute of Technology, where he was a member of the ANAK Society. May graduated in 1985 with a B.E.E. degree in electrical engineering. He then attended the University of California, Berkeley, where he earned an M.S. (1987) and Ph.D. (1991), both in electrical engineering and computer science.

Georgia Tech
May joined the Georgia Tech ECE faculty in 1991 as a member of the School's microelectronics group. His research is in the field of computer-aided manufacturing of integrated circuits. He was a National Science Foundation "National Young Investigator" (1993–98) and was Editor-in-Chief of IEEE Transactions on Semiconductor Manufacturing (1997–2001). He has authored over 200 articles and technical presentations in the area of IC computer-aided manufacturing. In 2001, he was named Motorola Foundation Professor, and was appointed associate chair for Faculty Development.

May is the founder of Georgia Tech's Summer Undergraduate Research in Engineering/Science (SURE) program, a summer research program designed to attract talented minority students into graduate school. He also is the founder and director of Facilitating Academic Careers in Engineering and Science program (FACES), a program designed to encourage minority engagement in engineering and science careers in academia. May was a National Science Foundation and an AT&T Bell Laboratories graduate fellow, and has worked as a member of the technical staff at AT&T Bell Laboratories in Murray Hill, New Jersey. He is a member of the National Advisory Board of the  National Society of Black Engineers (NSBE).

UC Davis
Gary May was appointed to be the seventh chancellor of the University of California, Davis in February 2017, and officially took office in July of the same year. Since taking office, May has been known for his active participation in campus events and has chosen "Future Forward" as the theme of his first fall welcome. May has also been praised for his work on the Aggie Square development, a transformative project that is equal parts research, innovation, and opportunity for the local residents and neighborhoods. UC President Emerita Janet Napolitano has referred to May as "one of my best hires ever."

Controversy
May has been a member of the Board of Directors for defense contractor Leidos since 2015. Succeeding former UC Davis Chancellor Linda Katehi, he has received criticism since taking the position for participating in outside boards. His involvement with Leidos—which frequently works with government agencies such as U.S. Immigration and Customs Enforcement, the National Security Agency, United States Border Patrol, and the United States Department of Homeland Security—has prompted criticism from media outlets and students in the Davis community.

Notable awards
 National Academy of Engineering Member, 2018 
 Presidential Award for Excellence in Science, Math and Engineering Mentorship, 2015
 ECEDHA Leadership Award, 2015
 AAAS Fellow, 2009.
 IEEE Fellow, 2006. "For contributions to education in semiconductor manufacturing and engineering."

References

External links
 Georgia Tech SURE Program

1964 births
Fellows of the American Association for the Advancement of Science
Fellow Members of the IEEE
Georgia Tech faculty
Georgia Tech alumni
Living people
UC Berkeley College of Engineering alumni
Chancellors of the University of California, Davis
People from St. Louis